The Portuguese Podengo, also known as the Podengo Português or Portuguese Warren Hound, is a hound (sight and scent) breed from Portugal. As a breed, the Podengo is divided into three size categories that are not interbred: small (Pequeno), medium (Médio) and large (Grande). Their coats are either short and 'smooth', or longer and 'wired'. The smooth coated variety is traditional, whereas the wire coated variety is an outcome of the assimilation of various other breeds during the 20th century. In general, the breed is healthy; the Pequeno (small) variety has an average lifespan of approximately 15–17 years.

All Podengo types are hardy, intelligent and lively dogs, excelling at agility and making fine companions. Loyal and fearless, Podengos are also good house guards and are amenable to training by dog experienced people and those that enjoy  primitive (unrefined, "less domesticated") dog behavior.

Keen hunting dogs, the Podengo has an affinity for game regardless of size. Typically, the dogs hunt in a pack with their handler following. When game is found, they kill and retrieve it, or flush it towards the hunter to be shot. Each size category traditionally hunts game appropriate to their size and temperament. (Pequeno: rabbits; Medio: rabbits and wild boar; Grande: deer and wild boar).

Description 
The Portuguese Podengo is bred in three size varieties, the Large, Medium and Small (in Portuguese the Grande, Medio and Pequeno). According to the Clube Português de Canicultura's breed standard states the Large stands  at the withers and healthy adults weigh , the Medium stands  at the withers and healthy adults weigh , and the Small stands  at the withers and healthy adults weigh .

General information 

The Grande (large) was developed for deer and wild boar hunting. It will exhaust and hold down the prey and await the hunter's gun. The Grande is now very rare in its home country.

The Medio (medium) was developed for rabbit chasing, flushing, hunting and retrieval. Its hunting style includes catlike stalking and, similar to the Ibizan Hound, it often jumps above the prey before landing on or near it to flush it out of dense brush, rock crevices or burrows. It will dig if necessary to flush prey.

The Pequeno (small) was also developed for flushing rabbits from cover. It is also a good mouser.

See also
 Dogs portal
 List of dog breeds

References 

 
 
 
 
 

FCI breeds
Hounds
Dog breeds originating in Portugal
Rare dog breeds